Hugh Boyd Secondary School (H.B.S.S. or HBSS), commonly known as Hugh Boyd or Boyd is a public, co-educational secondary school part of School District 38 Richmond (SD38), serving and educating 599 (2022-2023) students from grades 8 to 12. Hugh Boyd Secondary is the only school in Richmond that offers the International Baccalaureate Middle Years Programme. The school is located on the western side of Richmond, British Columbia, Canada, at 9200 No. 1 Road, stretching as far north to Francis Road and as far south to Pendleton Road. Hugh Boyd consists of the main school building, along with 3 parking lots (2 located at the front and back of the school along with 1 located far north on Francis Road), 2 soccer fields (Boyd Oval and Boyd South) and an artificial turf field with 4 sections (white, yellow, red, blue). Boyd also has 2 small extra buildings to the northwest with them being its Scout Hall and the Boyd Oval Field House. To the east, the school is conjoined with the West Richmond Community Centre with the West Richmond Pitch & Putt Golf Course being located just further east. Hugh Boyd Secondary was named after Hugh Boyd, the first reeve of the Township of Richmond (now the City of Richmond).

Hugh Boyd Secondary opened in 1960 originally as a junior secondary school serving only Grades 8-10 before it expanded in 1996 switching into a junior-senior secondary school serving students Grades 8–12. As of September 2020, the school had completed its needed near-CAD$11m seismic upgrades; replacing the school's previous tech wing with an addition of a new tech wing, library and other minor upgrades towards the building.

Its student population ranges each year, from approximately 500 to 800 students, most of whom come from the surrounding Seafair neighbourhood. Hugh Boyd's school catchment area, as of 2022, consists of the 7 elementary schools of Alfred B. Dixon, James Gilmore, John G. Diefenbaker, Lord Byng, Manoah Steves, Quilchena, and R.M. Grauer.

Hugh Boyd's school colours are black and gold, and the school's sports team name are the Hugh Boyd Trojans (commonly known as Trojans) along with the school's mascot being Tommy Trojan. Hugh Boyd offers sports programs such as Basketball, Volleyball, Soccer, Ultimate (Co-ed), Track & Field, Golf, and Cross-country Running.

Transportation 
Common ways of transportation to Hugh Boyd included are by walking, biking, driving, or using public transportation, specifically using bus route 401 One Road/Richmond-Brighouse Station which has bus stops covering most areas within Hugh Boyd's catchment area. Bus stops nearby Hugh Boyd for bus route 401 include NB No. 1 Road @ Osmond Avenue and SB No. 1 Road @ Osmond Avenue. Other ways of transportations include using a school bus from the school district.

Notable programs 
Hugh Boyd features a Combined Studies Program (shared with Matthew McNair Secondary), the school's very own Performing Arts program, a Learning Centre and Resource Program, and an Incentive Program (INC) for Science, Individuals and Societies, and Language and Literature (Grades 8–10). As of September 1, 2011, the school's candidacy for the International Baccalaureate Middle Years Programme (MYP) had been accepted and was recognized as an International Baccalaureate (IB) candidate school for the MYP. In the year 2013, Hugh Boyd had officially became an IB World school with the MYP having applied to the school's Grade 8 to 10 students.

Incentive 
"The Incentive Program challenges motivated students in Grades 8-10 to achieve academic and personal excellence. It is designed to meet the needs of high ability students with potential leadership qualities. Students in each grade will study English, Social Studies, and Science in an environment designed to challenge them. There will be opportunities for cooperative learning, independent study, and out of school field trip experiences. Students must be independent thinkers and risk- takers in their approach to learning and possess critical thinking and creative problem-solving skills."

Combined Studies 
"The Boyd Combined Studies Program is an alternative academic program designed to meet the learning needs of students in Grade 11 and 12 who have not achieved success in the regular classroom.  Students must be capable of writing all required provincial exams and complete learning outcomes in a smaller class grouping."

Learning Centre and Resource 
"Boyd also hosts an all-encompassing Learning Centre and Resource Program, with a substantive team of resource teachers and EAs who support students with diverse abilities."

Performing Arts 
"Boyd’s Performing Arts Program offers a wide range of courses in theatre and music including Theatre, Drumming, Jazz and Concert Band, and continues to win competitions and produce professional quality Theatre productions.  These programs are complemented by a Visual Arts Program offering courses in Photography, Drawing and Painting, Ceramics and Sculpture and Advanced Placement Studio Arts."

IB Middle Years Programme (MYP) 
"The Hugh Boyd Middle Years Program, is an International Baccalaureate program that all of our Grade 8-10 students are enrolled in.  Students are all educated using the IB Learner Profile tenets which has been “designed to develop internationally-minded people who, recognizing their common humanity and shared guardianship of the planet, help to create a better and more peaceful world”.  Learners in this program strive to be: Inquirers, Knowledgeable, Thinkers, Communicators, Principled, Open-Minded, Caring, Risk-Takers, Balanced and Reflective."

Learning, courses, and graduation 
Hugh Boyd's core curricular areas include Mathematics, Sciences, Language Arts, Social Studies, Physical Education (P.E.), and Career Life Education (C.L.E.). Passing the courses of the core curricular area, completing the Graduation Literacy and Numeracy assessments, along with obtaining 80 credits from courses from Grade 10-12 are needed for graduation and post-secondary learning. Courses offered in Boyd usually split up into more specific aspects of the existing course the higher grade a student is (i.e. Mathematics, Grade 8-9 → Foundations/Pre-Calculus, 10 → Foundations, 11-12 OR Pre-Calculus, 11–12).

Obtaining MYP requirements such as passing all core curricular areas, language acquisition, arts/design courses, the MYP Interdisciplinary Unit through Grade 8 to 10, having a minimum of 10 service/volunteer hours per grade (Grade 8–10), and passing the MYP Grade 10 Personal Project awards students with the IB MYP Certificate. The certificate may be used to support applications towards university and post-secondary learning.

History 
1960 - Hugh Boyd Secondary School is founded and opens to serve students Grade 8 to 10

1994 - All junior secondary schools in Richmond's School District 38 were converted to junior-senior secondary schools including Hugh Boyd

September 1, 2011 - School's candidacy for the IB MYP accepted

2013 - Hugh Boyd becomes an IB World school for the MYP

June/December 2018 - After 80 years of combined volunteer work, Haddow brothers, Bill and Bruce were set to leave the Trojans' football program

September 2020 - Hugh Boyd's seismic upgrade finished, school transitions to the Quarter from Linear system due to COVID-19

February 2021 - SD38's 'principal shuffle' affects 7 elementary schools and 5 secondary schools including Boyd

September 2021 - Hugh Boyd transitions from the Quarter to Semester system permanently along with all other schools in SD38 (excl. A.R. MacNeill, Richmond secondary schools)

September 2022 - Hugh Boyd re-establishes Block Rotation (ABCD to BADC) which occurs every Wednesday and Thursday. PLT is also re-established (Personal Learning Time) into its schedule occurring every Tuesday and Thursday starting at 8:30-9:25am

Notable alumni 
Nicki Clyne, Actress
Nicolas Macrozonaris, Athlete

References

External links
 Hugh Boyd Secondary School website
 https://facilities.sd38.bc.ca/sites/default/files/Project_Status_Reports/Boyd_SMP_Project_Status_01-02-2021.pdf
 https://boyd.sd38.bc.ca/ib-middle-years-programme
 https://www.richmond.ca/cityhall/archives/exhibits/schools/boomers/boyd.htm?PageMode=HTML
 https://boyd.sd38.bc.ca/files/boyd/2022-02/CourseSelection22.23.pdf

High schools in Richmond, British Columbia
Educational institutions established in 1960
1960 establishments in British Columbia